Ragnar Rump (born 12 September 1991) is an Estonian football and futsal and beach soccer player. He plays the position of defender.

International career
Rump was a member of Estonia national futsal team.

In 2013 he debuted in Estonia national beach soccer team.

References

External links
 

1991 births
Living people
Estonian footballers
Estonian men's futsal players
Estonian beach soccer players
JK Tallinna Kalev players
Meistriliiga players
FC Puuma Tallinn players
Association football defenders
People from Raasiku Parish